WillFull is a 2002 Australian film directed by Rebel Penfold-Russell and starring C. Thomas Howell.

References

External links

Australian fantasy comedy films
2000s English-language films
2000s Australian films